Port Victoria railway station is a disused station in Kent, United Kingdom, which opened on 11 September 1882 and closed in 1951.

The pier was discovered to be in need of repairs in 1896, and had also been damaged by a storm in November of that year. Between 1900 and 1903, the station was heavily used, as owing to a fire Queenborough pier was unavailable for use. During World War I the Admiralty took over Port Victoria. By 1931 further deterioration of the pier made it unsafe and a new station was built on the landward side. The train service by this time being just two passenger services per day. In 1941 the pier was demolished and the station closed on 11 June 1951. The station featured in two Pathé News films recorded in 1939 and 1947, both featuring Station Master Stephen Mills.

References

External links
 Port Victoria station on navigable 1940 O. S. map

Disused railway stations in Kent
Former South Eastern Railway (UK) stations
Railway stations in Great Britain opened in 1882
Railway stations in Great Britain closed in 1951
Transport in Medway